In God's Country is a Canadian television film, which aired on CTV in January 2007. The film stars Kelly Rowan as Judith Leavitt, a woman in a polygamous Mormon fundamentalist sect who rebels against the repressive rules of the community in a bid to protect her teenage daughters from being married off to older men against their will.

The cast also includes Richard Burgi, Martha MacIsaac, Hannah Lochner, Peter Outerbridge, Kristopher Turner and Catherine Disher.

Awards

References

External links

2007 films
2007 television films
Canadian drama television films
CTV Television Network original programming
English-language Canadian films
Films directed by John L'Ecuyer
2000s Canadian films